Gaongo is a town in the Gaongo Department of Bazèga Province in central Burkina Faso. The town has a population of 2,181 and is the capital of Gaongo Department.

References

Populated places in the Centre-Sud Region
Bazèga Province